Vanderhorstia ambanoro, the Ambanoro prawn-goby or twin-spotted shrimp-goby, is a species of fish native to the Indian Ocean and the western Pacific Ocean, where it occurs in lagoons and coastal bays at depths of from . This species inhabits areas with mud or sand substrates, where it lives in association with Alpheus shrimps. This species can reach a length of  TL. It can also be found in the aquarium trade.

References

External links
 

ambanoro
Fish described in 1957
Taxa named by Pierre Fourmanoir